Lori McNeil and Stephanie Rehe were the defending champions, but Rehe did not compete this year.

McNeil teamed up with Mercedes Paz and lost in the final to Patty Fendick and Andrea Strnadová. The score was 6–3, 6–4.

Seeds

Draw

Draw

References

External links
 Official results archive (ITF)
 Official results archive (WTA)

Internationaux de Strasbourgandnbsp;- Doubles
1992 Doubles
1992 in French tennis